The following is a list of characters in the Maximum Ride book series by James Patterson, cat movie, manga, and comic adaptations.

The Flock

Maximum Ride 
Maximum "Max" Ride is the title character and the primary protagonist of the series. She is an avian-human hybrid and the leader of the Flock, who begins the series as a 14-year-old. Max is half Hispanic, as revealed in Saving the World and Other Extreme Sports. Her powers include flying up to 350 miles per hour, breathing water, and hearing a Voice in her head which gives her advice. It is revealed in the third book that she is the daughter of Jeb Batchelder and Dr. Valencia Martinez, and thus the half-sister of Jeb's son Ari and Dr. Martinez's daughter Ella. A love triangle develops between Max, Fang, and Dylan, who was designed to be Max's "perfect other half". In Maximum Ride Forever, the teenaged Max gives birth to Phoenix, her daughter with Fang.

Fang 
Fang is second-in-command of the Flock and Max's best friend, later her boyfriend. He has dark hair and wings and has the abilities to virtually disappear, and the key to immortality in his DNA. He is somewhat reserved, but cares deeply about the Flock. He is usually very silent, and seems quite mysterious, always hiding his feelings. He runs a blog about the Flock's adventures. Fang and Max slowly fall in love over the course of the series, each growing jealous when the other encounters potential relationships. He splits from the Flock on several occasions after clashes with Max, but always returns. In Angel, he starts his own group of mutants and briefly dates Max's clone Maya, but reconciles with Max in Nevermore. Fang loses a wing and dies in Maximum Ride Forever, but is revived by Dylan. Fang and Max then have a baby girl named Phoenix.

Iggy 
Iggy is a 14-year-old avian-human hybrid, six months younger than Max. His real name is revealed to be James Griffiths. Due to the whitecoats' experiments to enhance his night vision, Iggy is effectively blind, though he can sense colors by touch, see if his surroundings are white, and identify people by feeling their fingerprints. He is notably sarcastic, the best friend of the Gasman, and enjoys building bombs.

In School's Out Forever, Iggy learns that he was kidnapped by the School when he was four months old. He finds his parents and decides to leave the Flock; however, he returns after learning that his parents were only interested in making money off his story. In Angel, Iggy is brainwashed by the Doomsday Group. He has a brief relationship with Max's half-sister Ella, ending with her death in Nevermore.

Nudge 
Nudge is 11 years old and is African-American. Her real name is revealed to be Monique. She has the abilities of psychometry and attracting metal, and is a gifted hacker. She is extremely talkative and likes fashion. As the series goes on, she begins to long for normality. In MAX she talks about cutting her wings off, but Max convinces her not to.

The Gasman (Gazzy) 
The Gasman, normally referred to by the nickname Gazzy, is 8 years old with blond hair and blue eyes. He is the biological brother of Angel, the only blood-related siblings of the Flock. He and Angel were sold to the School as babies by their parents. He has a mischievous nature, and he and Iggy are experts at constructing and setting off bombs and explosives. He is also adept at other types of engineering and inventing. He is called The Gasman because he has digestive issues and frequently passes gas. He is skilled at mimicry and ventriloquism, and later develops the ability to produce smelly clouds of gas.

Angel 
Angel is the youngest Flock member at 6 years old, with blue eyes and curly blonde hair. She gains numerous powers throughout the series, but her most prominent power is the ability to read and control minds. She is usually mistaken to be powerless and innocent, but she is truly extremely intelligent and dangerous. In Fang, Angel believes that she is the strongest of the Flock, and holds a vote, temporarily kicking Max out of the group. In Angel, she seems to have calmed some of the extreme changes in her personality that occurred in Fang and helps Max to balance her feelings for Fang and Dylan. She appears to be content with her role and no longer bids for power. In Nevermore, she reveals that she is the Voice in Max's head, although this revelation creates continuity problems. In Maximum Ride Forever, Angel takes on a prophet-like role after receiving visions of the Apocalypse and leads an army of survivors and mutants.

Total 
Total is a black Cairn Terrier whom Angel saves from the Institute at the end of The Angel Experiment. His name is a reference to Toto from The Wizard of Oz. In School's Out Forever, Total reveals that he can speak. He has the ability to jump to great heights, and eventually grows his own tiny wings. He is often humorous and dramatic, loves culture such as theater and cuisine, and hates being treated like a normal dog. At the end of Fang, Total marries Akila, a normal Alaskan Malamute. Akila dies in Maximum Ride Forever. At some point Total gets married again. His daughter Io appears in HAWK.

Antagonists

The School 
The School is a science facility in Death Valley that creates and experiments on human-animal hybrids and mutants. It is a branch of the worldwide corporation known as Itexicon or Itex, which has headquarters in Germany and is led by the Director, Marian Janssen.

Dr. Jeb Batchelder 

Jebediah Batchelder is a scientist, or “whitecoat”, who works for the School that created the Flock. He broke the Flock out and took them to a safe house deep in the mountains, where he taught them survival and fighting skills before disappearing. In The Angel Experiment, he is revealed to still be alive and working again for the School. At first the Flock believes he's a traitor, but he is secretly working to help them overthrow Itex. In Saving the World and Other Extreme Sports, he is revealed to be Max's biological father and implies that he is also the Voice in her head; however, it is stated in the next book that he is not the Voice after all. In Nevermore, he turns completely against the Flock, clones Ari in an attempt to fix his old mistakes, and tries to kill Fang. In Maximum Ride Forever he has joined the Remedy and attempts to inject Max with the “upgrading” serum, but is killed by members of Fang's gang who came to rescue her.

He contributed DNA to create Max and is also the father of Ari. He is an unreliable parent, using Max as a pawn and allowing Ari to be transformed into an Eraser, but he does love his children and grieves over Ari's death.

Ari Batchelder 
Ari is Jeb's son, who was turned into an Eraser at the age of seven while Jeb was living with the Flock. Due to being mutated with wolf DNA after birth, he is always partially morphed, unlike the other Erasers who can shapeshift. He often leads the Erasers hunting the Flock. He both loves and resents Max, who got more of their father's attention. In Saving The World And Other Extreme Sports, as the other Erasers die and Ari's expiration date approaches, he reconciles with Max and joins the Flock. He goes with Max's side of the Flock to Europe to investigate Itex and helps them during the final battle, but his expiration date arrives mid-fight and he dies in Max's arms. In The Final Warning, the Flock attends his funeral.

In MAX, the Flock's new enemy, Mr. Chu, creates an Ari lookalike robot in an attempt to frighten Max; it is destroyed in Iggy and Gazzy's explosion. In Nevermore, Jeb turns to cloning Ari in an attempt to bring him back. The failed clones, led by a successful copy, attempt to kill Fang but are defeated.

Erasers 

The Erasers, created by the School in Death Valley, are half-human, half-wolf hybrids bred as guards and later sent to hunt down the members of the Flock. Their powers are superhuman strength, but they also eventually gain wings that are crudely grafted onto their shoulder blades. They have a life span of about 4 years to reach maturity and approximately a year or two to hunt the Flock. Jeb's son, Ari, who was turned into an Eraser at a very young age, is one of the last to die when Itex 'retires' all of the Erasers and replaces them with the Flyboys, robotic Erasers with synthetic skin. Erasers appear later in the series in Fang when Jeb clones Ari.

Maya 

Maya, originally known as Max II, is a clone of Max. She secretly replaces Max in a plot to destroy the Flock, but is immediately obvious due to her different personality and not knowing much about them. Max is supposed to fight her to the death, but refuses to kill her.

She later changes her name and hairstyle to show that she is her own person. She joins Fang's new group, and he finds himself attracted to her. However, she is killed by Ari's clone and dies in Fang's arms.

Anne Walker 

Anne is seemingly an FBI agent, who meets the Flock at a hospital where Fang is being treated. She offers them protection in exchange for a chance to study them in "non-painful, noninvasive" ways. Anne brings them to her country château and treats them with parental kindness and generosity. She also enrolls them in a private school. She offers to adopt them, making Max jealous, but when Erasers attack the school, it's revealed that Anne is actually Jeb's boss.

Dr. Roland ter Borcht 

Roland ter Borcht is a German geneticist with a thick accent who works for Itex. The Flock mocks him and refuses to cooperate with his experiments.

Dr. Marian Janssen (the Director) 

The Director runs the School and Itex, and claims to be a hybrid human-Galápagos tortoise, 107 years old. She plots to kill half of the world's population and sell the Flock as living weapons. She also claims to be Max's mother, but this is disproven.

Omega 

Omega is a superhuman creation of Itex, considered their most successful experiment by the Director. He looks human but has superior speed, strength and senses. He has no free will. His only weakness is slow sight reactions and tracking. The Director forces Max to compete with Omega in several challenges to demonstrate Omega's superior skills, and then instructs them to fight to the death. In the final battle, Max defeats him but refuses to kill him.

The Über-Director 

The Über-Director heads an unnamed company, possibly Itexicon (as his name implies he is the replacement for the Director.) He is composed of organs in glass cases connected by metal limbs (making him half-machine and half-human) and uses a wheelchair. It is implied that the Über-Director is one of the experiments Max saw when Ari gave her a tour of the school's experiments. Max calls him "the ÜD" to annoy him. In The Final Warning, he captures the Flock and auctions them. During the auction, a hurricane tears through the building, and the Über-Director is killed. He is the only person Max has ever killed; she justifies it with the claim that "(Über-Director) was a machine, someone's consciousness hooked up to a biomechanical body", and rarely dwells on it.

Flyboys 

Flyboys are the Erasers' robotic replacements. Flyboys are strong, fast and nimble both in the air and on the ground. Some have guns attached to their hands. However, they are slow-witted and easily destroyed by the Flock.

Dr. Hans Gunther-Hagen 
Dr. Gunther-Hagen is a famous and charismatic German scientist who formerly worked for Itex. He created Dylan, who he intended as Max's perfect mate, and repeatedly tries to influence them to breed and start a new dynasty. He also has some special abilities such as instantly healing from illnesses and regenerating small extremities, such as fingers. In Maximum Ride Forever, a now aged Gunther-Hagen is revealed to be the evil mastermind known as the Remedy. He allowed the meteor to strike the earth in Nevermore and kill millions of people in an attempt to eradicate the genetically "imperfect," so he could populate the earth with his genetically "perfect" creations. He has built a large underground shelter in Russia known as Himmel and develops a serum known as "upgrading" which turns his subjects into genetically superior, brainwashed "Horsemen.” He uses his Horsemen to kill the imperfect mutants still living on earth, including the Flock. He desperately tries to kill Max and her unborn baby to keep her imperfect genes from spreading, but Max kills him by dropping him over the ocean.

Mark 
Mark is a member of the Doomsday Group, which attempts to blow up Paris. He is greedy, with a lust for power; in battle he is strong. Mark is defeated when Max and Maya unite to overcome him. He is presumed dead at the end of Angel when Max sees his body, but he appears again and dies in Nevermore.

William Pruitt 
Pruitt is the children-hating principal of the school that Max and the Flock attend in Saving the World and Other Extreme Sports. While spying at recess, Iggy and Gazzy find files indicating that the school was formerly an insane asylum for the incurably ill. It is connected to the School. Pruitt later threatens Max with a taser and tries to catch them with scientists posing as teachers.

Mr. Chu 

Mr. Chu is an Asian man first appearing in MAX who tries to force the Flock to stop helping the environmental agency known as the CSM. He has an army of humanoid robots which the Flock calls M-Geeks. He kidnaps Dr. Valencia Martinez in an attempt to stop the CSM permanently. He is eventually revealed to be a lizard-like boy named Robert, wearing a realistic mask, who works for Dr. Gunther-Hagen.

Supporting Characters

Dr. Valencia Martinez 

Dr. Valencia Martinez is a Hispanic veterinarian who lives in Arizona. She gives Max medical attention after Max is shot rescuing her daughter Ella. Max is struck by her kindness and cleverness, and frequently returns to her for help. It is eventually revealed that Dr. Martinez once worked with the School and donated the egg that was used to create Max, only to be locked out of the process. She and Max are overjoyed to realize that they are mother and daughter. Dr. Martinez founds the CSM (Coalition to Stop the Madness), an environmental organization that the Flock often helps. In Nevermore, she seemingly betrays the Flock and works with Gunther-Hagen, but it's revealed she was brainwashed. She takes the Flock to a private island called Paradise to wait out the Apocalypse, just before a meteor strikes the earth. In Maximum Ride Forever, it is revealed that she and her daughter Ella died in the aftermath of the meteor strike.

Ella Martinez 

Ella is the daughter of Dr. Martinez. Ella has a crush on Iggy, which makes Max uncomfortable because she "feels like a mom to Iggy". In The Angel Experiment, Max stops to save Ella from a group of bullies, and is shot. She asks Ella for help and spends two days recuperating at Ella's house. In Saving the World and Other Extreme Sports, Ella is revealed to be Max's half-sister. Ella flirts with Iggy on a few occasions. In Angel, Ella is brainwashed by the Doomsday Group. Even after the Flock tries to deprogram her, she runs away, leaving the message "I was meant to have wings." At some point she is rescued by her mother and taken to the island of Paradise. In Maximum Ride Forever', it is revealed that Ella died.

Akila 

Akila is a Malamute with whom Total falls in love in The Final Warning. She is with the Flock when they are taken by Gozen to the Über-Director's auction when the hurricane kills the Über-Director. In MAX, Total muses about leaving the Flock to marry Akila. In the first epilogue of Fang, she and Total get married, with the Flock in attendance. She later dies in Maximum Ride Forever.

Dr. Brigid Dwyer 

Dr. Dwyer is a twenty-one-year-old scientist who works in Antarctica and escorts the Flock there. She is described with blonde or red hair at different points. Max is jealous of her friendship with Fang, despite their seven-year age difference. Fang seems to ignore Max when he is around Brigid, who is unaware of this tension (and of Max's feelings for Fang). Max also resents the fact that Fang writes about Brigid in his blog, but not about her. Max compares her with a redheaded student named Lissa whom Fang seemed attracted to in School's Out - Forever. At the end of MAX, Brigid interacts with Mr. Chu, which Max and her Voice find suspicious.

The Voice 

Throughout the series, Max hears a mysterious Voice in her head which gives her cryptic advice. It has also sometimes given her visions. Jeb implies that he is the Voice in Saving the World and Other Extreme Sports, only to state in The Final Warning that he can only mimic it.

Some other characters including Ari and Angel also receive advice from a Voice. At the end of Nevermore, Angel reveals that she is the Voice in Max's head.

Other mutants

Dylan 
Dylan is an avian-human hybrid who joins the Flock in Fang. He is said to be Max's "perfect other half", programmed to love Max. His presence disrupts Max and Fang's romance. Dylan can heal himself almost instantly by placing his own saliva on his wounds and putting pressure on it. In addition, he has extremely good vision and clairvoyance. In Nevermore, Dylan goes on a violent rampage when Max chooses Fang over him, but reconciles with her by the end of the book and remains with the Flock after the apocalypse. In Maximum Ride Forever, Dylan is seemingly killed but in reality is kidnapped by the Remedy and turned into a Horseman. He retains his free will and fakes the Flock's death.

Ratchet

Star 
Fang's second recruit in Angel, Star is from an upper-class family. Her ability is super-speed. As a result, her body burns energy quickly and she must eat a lot to compensate. She and Ratchet often quarrel, with Kate (Star's friend from Catholic school) mediating. Star received her powers when she was abducted from a school field trip and subjected to experiments. She also demonstrates the ability to spin in a circle creating a high-pitched noise which can instantly de-hypnotize victims of the Doomsday group. In Nevermore, she is revealed to be a traitor on the Erasers' side.

Kate Tan Wei Ying
Kate is the third member of Fang's flock, whose powers include strength and quick reflexes. A pacifist and vegan, Kate breaks up fights between Ratchet and Star. She is an old friend of Star's; Ratchet flirts with her. In Nevermore, she is revealed to be a traitor on the Erasers' side.

Holden
The final recruit for Fang's Flock, Holden was experimented on and has scars on his arms . He can regrow limbs, heal quickly and breathe underwater. The other members (and Holden himself) call him "Starfish" because he has starfish DNA. He is 15 but looks more like a 10-year-old.

Beth
Organizer of a Doomsday Group rally in Paris during Angel, Beth attempts to exert mind control on Fang and others through a television news channel but the attempt fails when Moon changes the channel. Beth is described as "the Queen of the Doomsday Group" when she asserts herself against Mark, ordering him not to kill Max.

Harry 
Harry is a bird-kid whom Max meets in Maximum Ride Forever. He is described to be more bird than human, being completely covered by feathers (except his head), and able to fly perfectly and effortlessly. He can not talk, and when Max asks him, "Who are you?" he repeats, "Huryu"! When Max introduces herself as Maximum Ride, he introduces himself as Huryu, which Max changes to Harry. He becomes part of the flock and calls Max "Max Mum".

Characters in Sequel Series

Hawk 
Hawk, born Phoenix, is the daughter of Max and Fang born during the events of Maximum Ride Forever. Like her parents, she is a human-avian hybrid with wings. She is only briefly spoken of in Maximum Ride Forever as she begins her first flying lessons with her family. As a child, she is separated from her parents and lost in the City of the Dead. Taking the name Hawk after her pet hawk Ridley, she grows up in the McCallum children's home alongside other mutants, with no memory of her family. Due to the constant need to protect the children at the orphanage, Hawk never learned how to fly very well; only needing to use her wings in desperate situations.

Pietro Pater 
Pietro Pater is Hawk's friend. His father is the leader of Pater, which is one of the Six.

Calypso  
Calypso (birth name unknown) is a young girl around the age of eight, (in the present tense of the book Hawk) with no knowledge of her birth parents. She is a bug human-hybrid who was dropped off at the orphanage at the assumed age of three. She arrived at the McCallum children's home with a diaper and dirty teeshirt, with the text "Calypso" on the front; thus being dubbed by her fellow orphans as "Calypso." She has unusually big eyes and bug antennae protruding out of her back, which is most likely an outcome of her bug mutation, along with the ability of enhanced strength. She was also seen multiple times in the book of Hawk with the ability to see the future by a few minutes, leading to the belief that she has the ability of near-future vision. Her primary caretaker is Hawk.

Rain  
Rain (birth name unknown) is a preteen to early teenage girl around the age of 10-13. She is a mutant of some kind, yet it isn't specified what mutations she contains. She has splotches of melted-looking skin, implying she may have been affected by an acid storm.

References

External links 
 Official Maximum Ride website

Characters